The siege of Caen  took place in 1450 during the Hundred Years War when French forces laid siege to Caen in the English-controlled Duchy of Normandy following their decisive victory at the Battle of Formigny.

After Formingy, the remnants of the English Army under Edmund Beaufort, 2nd Duke of Somerset withdrew to Caen, pursued by the much larger French army commanded by Arthur de Richemont. After three weeks of siege Somerset surrendered. English control of Normandy rapidly collapsed, ending with the loss of Cherbourg in August.

References

Bibliography
 Tony Jaques, Dictionary of Battles and Sieges: A-E. Greenwood Publishing Group, 2007.

Sieges of the Hundred Years' War
1450 in England
1450s in France
Caen
Hundred Years' War, 1415–1453
Military history of Normandy
Caen